Camera Work was a quarterly photographic journal published by Alfred Stieglitz from 1903 to 1917. It presented high-quality photogravures by some of the most important photographers in the world, with the goal to establish photography as a fine art. It has been called "consummately intellectual", "by far the most beautiful of all photographic magazines", and "a portrait of an age [in which] the artistic sensibility of the nineteenth century was transformed into the artistic awareness of the present day."

Background
At the start of the 20th century Alfred Stieglitz was the single most important figure in American photography. He had been working for many years to raise the status of photography as a fine art by writing numerous articles, creating exhibitions, exhibiting his own work and, especially by trying to influence the artistic direction of the highly important Camera Club of New York. He was not successful in the latter, and as a result by the spring of 1902 he was both frustrated and exhausted. He had spent the past five years as editor of the Camera Club's journal Camera Notes, where his efforts to promote photography as a fine art form were regularly challenged by the older, more conservative members of the Club who thought photography was nothing more than a technical process. On the contrary, Stieglitz believed the photography is not just a mere source of documenting the facts nor a tool to copy painted art but a new way of expression and creation (Pictorialism). Rather than continue to battle against these challenges, he resigned as editor of Camera Notes and spent the summer at his home in Lake George, New York, thinking about what he could do next.

 
His close friends and fellow photographers, led by Joseph Keiley, encouraged him to carry out his dream and publish a new magazine, one that would be independent of any conservative influences. It did not take him long to come up with a new plan. In August, 1902, he printed a two-page prospectus "in response to the importunities of many serious workers in photographic fields that I should undertake the publication of an independent magazine devoted to the furtherance of modern photography." He said he would soon launch a new journal that would be "the best and most sumptuous of photographic publications" and that it would published entirely by himself, "owing allegiance only to the interests of photography." He called the new journal Camera Work, a reference to the phrase in his prospectus statement in which he meant to distinguish artistic photographers like himself from the old-school technicians with whom he had fought for many years. To emphasize the fact that this was an independent journal every cover would proclaim "Camera Work: A Photographic Quarterly, Edited and Published by Alfred Stieglitz, New York".

Design and production

Stieglitz was determined from the start that Camera Work would be the finest publication of its day. He asked Edward Steichen to design the cover, a simple gray-green background with the magazine's title, acknowledgement of Stieglitz's editorial control and issue number and date in an Art Nouveau-style typeface created especially by Steichen for the journal. Even the advertisements at the back of each issue were creatively designed and presented, often by Stieglitz himself. Eastman Kodak took the back cover of almost every issue, and at Stieglitz's insistence they used the same typeface Steichen had designed for the cover.

Gravures were produced from the photographers' original negatives whenever possible or occasionally from the original prints. If the gravure came from a negative this fact was noted in the accompanying text, and these gravures were then considered to be original prints.

Stieglitz, always a perfectionist, personally tipped in each of the photogravures in every issue, touching up dust spots or scratches when necessary. This time-consuming and exhausting work assured only the highest standards in every copy but sometimes delayed the mailing of the issues since Stieglitz would not allow anyone else to do it. The visual quality of the gravures was so high that when a set of prints failed to arrive for a Photo-Secession exhibition in Brussels, a selection of gravures from the magazine was hung instead. Most viewers assumed they were looking at the original photographs.

Before the first issue was even printed, Stieglitz received 68 subscriptions for his new publication. With his typical extravagant aesthetic taste and unwillingness to compromise, Stieglitz insisted that 1000 copies of every issue be printed regardless of the number of subscriptions. Under financial duress he reduced the number to 500 for the final two issues. The annual subscription rate at the start was US$4, or US$2 for single issues.

Publishing history

Early years (1903–1906)
The inaugural issue of Camera Work was dated January 1903, but was actually mailed on 15 December 1902. In it Stieglitz set forth the mission of the new journal:

"Photography being in the main a process in monochrome, it is on subtle gradations of tone and value that its artistic beauty so frequently depends. It is therefore highly necessary that reproductions of photographic work must be made with exceptional care, and discretion of the spirit of the original is to be retained, though no reproductions can do justice to the subtleties of some photographs. Such supervision will be given to the illustrations that will appear in each number of Camera Work. Only examples of such works as gives evidence of individuality and artistic worth, regardless of school, or contains some exceptional feature of technical merit, or such as exemplifies some treatment worthy of consideration, will find recognition in these pages. Nevertheless, the Pictorial will be the dominating feature of the magazine."

In his first editorial Stieglitz expressed gratitude to a group of photographers to whom he was indebted. He listed them in a specific order: Robert Demachy, Will Cadby, Edward Steichen, Gertrude Käsebier, Frank Eugene, James Craig Annan, Clarence H. White, William Dyer, Eva Watson, Frances Benjamin Johnston, and R. Child Baley. Over the next fourteen years he showed a decided bias by publishing many of their photographs while other talented photographers barely received notice.

 
During this early period Stieglitz used Camera Work to expand the same vision and aesthetics that he had promoted in Camera Notes. He even used the services of the same three assistant editors who worked with him on Camera Notes: Dallett Fuguet, Joseph Keiley and John Francis Strauss. Over the years both Fuguet and Keiley contributed extensively to the journal through their own articles and photographs. Strauss’ role appears to have been more in the background. Neither Stieglitz nor his associate editors received a salary for their work, nor were any photographers paid for having their work published.

One of the purposes of the new journal was to serve as a vehicle for the Photo-Secession, an invitation-only group that Stieglitz founded in 1902 to promote photography as an art form. Much of the work published in Camera Work would come from the Photo-Secession exhibitions he hosted, and soon rumors circulated that the magazine was intended only for those involved in the Photo-Secession. In 1904 Stieglitz attempted to counter this idea by publishing a full-page notice in the journal in order to correct the "erroneous impression…that only the favored few are admitted to our subscription list." He then went on to say "…although it is the mouthpiece of the Photo-Secession that fact will not be allowed to hamper its independence in the slightest degree."

While making this proclamation in the journal, Stieglitz continued to unabashedly promote the Photo-Secession in its pages. In 1905, he wrote "The most important step in the history of the Photo-Secession" was taken with the opening of his photography gallery that year. "Without the flourish of trumpets, without the stereotypes, press-view or similar antiquated functions, the Secessionists and a few friends informally opened the Little Galleries of the Photo-Secession at 291 Fifth Avenue, New York."

Expanding the realm (1907–1909)
Throughout its publication, it is impossible to view Camera Work separately from the rest of Stieglitz's life. He lived to promote photography as an art form and to challenge the norms of how art may be defined. As his own successes increased, either from recognition of his own photos or through his efforts to organize international exhibitions of photography, the content of Camera Work reflected these changes. Articles began to appear with such titles as "Symbolism and Allegory" (Charles Caffin, No 18 1907) and "The Critic as Artist" (Oscar Wilde, No 27 1909), and the focus of Camera Work turned from primarily American content to a more international scope.

Stieglitz also continued to intertwine the walls of his galleries with the pages of his magazine. Stieglitz's closest friends (Steichen, Demachy, White, Käsebier and Keiley) were represented in both, while many others were granted one but not the other. Increasingly, a single photographer was given the preponderance of coverage in an issue, and in doing so Stieglitz relied more and more on his small circle of old supporters. This led to increased tensions among Stieglitz and some of his original colleagues, and when Stieglitz began to introduce paintings, drawings and other art forms in his gallery, many photographers saw it as the breaking point in their relationship with Stieglitz.

While this was taking place, in 1909 Stieglitz was notified about yet another sign of the increasingly difficult times. London's Linked Ring, which for more than a decade Stieglitz had looked to as model for the Photo-Secession, finally dissolved in antipathy. Stieglitz knew this signaled the end of an era, but rather than be set back by these changes he began making plans to integrate Camera Work even further into the realm of modern art.

Beyond photography (1910–1914)

In January, 1910, Stieglitz abandoned his policy of reproducing only photographic images, and in issue 29 he included four caricatures by Mexican artist Marius de Zayas. From this 'point on Camera Work would include both reproductions of and articles on modern painting, drawing and aesthetics, and it marked a significant change in both the role and the nature of the magazine. This change was brought about by a similar transformation at Stieglitz's New York gallery, which had been known as the Little Galleries of the Photo-Secession until 1908. That year he changed the name of the gallery to "291", and he began showing avant-garde modern artists such as Auguste Rodin and Henri Matisse along with photographers. The positive responses he received at the gallery encouraged Stieglitz to broaden the scope of Camera Work as well, although he decided against any name change for the journal.

This same year a huge retrospective exhibition of the Photo-Secession was held at the Albright-Knox Art Gallery in Buffalo, New York. More than fifteen thousand people visited the exhibition over its four-week showing, and at the end the Gallery purchased twelve prints and reserved one room for the permanent display of photography. This was the first time a museum in the U.S. acknowledged that photography was in fact an art form, and, in many ways, it marked the beginning of the end for the Photo-Secession.

After the Buffalo show Stieglitz began showcasing more and more art in Camera Work. In 1911 a double issue was devoted to reproductions of Rodin's drawings and analyses of his, Cézanne's and Picasso's work. While this was a very bold move to promote modern art, it did not sit well with the photographers who still made up most of the subscription list. Half of the existing subscribers immediately cancelled their subscriptions.

By 1912 the number of subscriptions had dropped to 304. The shift away from photography to a mix of other art and photography had cost Stieglitz many subscribers, yet he stubbornly refused to change his editorial direction. In an attempt to inflate the value of the issues in the marketplace and thereby attract more subscribers, Stieglitz began to destroy unwanted copies. The price of back issues soon increased substantially, but the number of paid subscriptions continued to dwindle.

Final years (1915–1917)
By 1915 the cultural changes and the economic effects of the war finally took its toll on Camera Work. The number of subscribers dwindled to just thirty-seven, and both the costs and even the availability of the paper on which it was printed became challenging. Coupled with the public's decreased interest in pictorial photography, these problems simply became too much for Stieglitz to bear. He published issue 47 in January, 1915, and devoted most of it what Steichen referred to as a "project in self-adulation". Three years earlier Stieglitz had asked many of his friends to tell him what his gallery "291" meant to them. He received sixty-eight replies and printed all of them, unedited (including Steichen's previously mentioned opinion), in issue 47. As another sign of the changing times, only four of the comments came from photographers – all of the rest were from painters, illustrators and art critics. It was the only issue that did not include an illustration of any kind.

Issue 48 did not appear until October 1916, sixteen months later. In the interim two important events occurred. At the insistence of his friend Paul Haviland Stieglitz had begun another journal, 291, which was intended to bring attention to his gallery of the same name. This effort occupied much of Stieglitz's time and interest from the summer of 1915 until the last issue was published in early 1916. In April 1916, Stieglitz finally met Georgia O'Keeffe, although the latter had gone to see exhibits at "291" since 1908. The two immediately were attracted to each other, and Stieglitz began devoting more and more of his time to their developing relationship.

In issue 48 Stieglitz introduced the work of a young photographer, Paul Strand, whose photographic vision was indicative of the aesthetic changes now at the heart of Camera Work's demise. Strand shunned the soft focus and symbolic content of the Pictorialists and instead strived to create a new vision that found beauty in the clear lines and forms of ordinary objects. By publishing Strand's work Stieglitz was hastening the end of the aesthetic vision he had championed for so long.

Nine months later, in June 1917, what was to be the final issue of Camera Work appeared. It was devoted almost entirely to Strand's photographs. Even after the difficulties of publishing the last two issues Stieglitz did not indicate he was ready to give up; he included an announcement that the next issue would feature O’Keefe's work. Soon after publishing this issue, however, Stieglitz realized that he could no longer afford to publish Camera Work or to run "291" due to the effect of the war and the changes in the New York arts scene. He ended both of these efforts with no formal announcement or notice.

When he closed "291" Stieglitz had several thousand unsold copies of Camera Work, along with more than 8,000 unsold copies of 291. He sold most of these in bulk to a ragpicker, and he gave away or destroyed the rest. Almost all of the copies that remain today came from the collections of the original subscribers.

Legacy
For most of its life Camera Work was universally praised by both photographers and critics. Here are some examples that appeared in photography magazines when Camera Work first appeared:

"When Camera Notes was at its height, it seemed impossible for it to be surpassed. We can only say that in this case it has been passed, that Stieglitz has out-Stieglitzed Stieglitz and that, in producing Camera Work he has beaten that record which he himself held, which no one else has ever approached."

"For Camera Work as a whole we have no words of praise too high, it stands alone; and of Mr. Alfred Stieglitz American photographers may well be proud. It is difficult to estimate how much he has done for the good of photography, working for years against opposition and without sympathy, and it is to his extraordinary capacity for work, his masterful independence which compels conviction, and his self-sacrificing devotion that we owe the beautiful work before us."

While Stieglitz definitely deserves this praise, he should not be seen without fault. In spite of Stieglitz's initial statement that Camera Work "owes allegiance to no organization or clique", in the end it was primarily a visual showcase for his work and that of his close friends. Of the 473 photographs published in Camera Work during its fifteen-year existence, 357 were the work of just fourteen photographers: Stieglitz, Steichen, Frank Eugene, Clarence H. White, Alvin Langdon Coburn, J. Craig Annan, Hill & Adamson, Baron Adolf de Meyer, Heinrich Kühn, George Seeley, Paul Strand, Robert Demachy, Gertrude Käsebier  and Anne Brigman. The remaining 116 photographs came from just thirty-nine other photographers.

Three complete sets of Camera Work have sold at auction in recent years. A complete set of all 50 numbers in their original bindings sold at Sotheby's in October 2011 for $398,500. In 2007 a second complete set, kept in contemporary clamshell cases, sold for $229,000. A complete set bound into book volumes sold in October 2016 for $187,500.

Gallery

Issues and contents
The complete run of Camera Work consists of fifty-three issues, including three special (un-numbered) issues. Three of the numbered issues were double numbers (Nos. 34–35, 42-43 and 49–50), so only fifty actual journals were published.

Number 1, January 1903 
Photographs: six by Gertrude Käsebier; one by Alfred Stieglitz, Hand of Man; one by A. Radclyffe Dugmore.
Paintings: one by D. W. Tryon; one by Pierre Puvis de Chavannes.
Texts: by Alfred Stieglitz, Charles Caffin, Dallett Fuguet, John Barrett Kerfoot, Sidney Allan (Sadakichi Hartmann), Edward Steichen, Joseph Keiley, and others.

Number 2, April 1903 
Photographs: twelve by Edward Steichen.
Texts: articles on Edward Steichen by Charles Caffin and Sadakichi Hartmann; miscellaneous by R. Child Bayley, Dallett Fuguet, John Barrett Kerfoot, and Eva Watson -Schütze.

Number 3, July 1903 
Photographs: five by Clarence White; three by Ward Muir; one by J. C. Strauss; one by Joseph Keiley, one by Alfred Stieglitz, The Street: Design for a Poster; one by Alvin Langdon Coburn.
Paintings: one by Mary Cassatt; one by Eugène Boudin; one by Rembrandt.
Texts: Charles Caffin on Clarence White; miscellaneous by John Barrett Kerfoot, Dallett Fuguet, Ward Muir, and others; quotations from James McNeill Whistler, Peter Henry Emerson.
Inserts: Facsimile of handwritten piece too late for previous issue by Maurice Maeterlinck, "Je Crois"; principles and membership list of Photo-Secession: "Fellows" including "Founders and Council "; Associates.

Number 4, October 1903 
Photographs: six by Frederick H. Evans; one by Alfred Stieglitz, The Flatiron Building; one by Arthur F. Becher.
Texts: George Bernard Shaw on F. H. Evans; miscellaneous by Sadakichi Hartmann, Dallett Fuguet, John Barrett Kerfoot, Charles Caffin, Joseph Keiley, and Edward Steichen.

Number 5, January 1904 
Photographs: six by Robert Demachy; one by Prescott Adamson; one by Frank Eugene (Smith).
Texts: Joseph Keiley on Robert Demachy; Sadakichi Hartmann on criticism; miscellaneous by F. H. Evans, Dallett Fuguet, and others; quotations from James McNeill Whistler.

Number 6, April 1904 
Photographs: six by Alvin Langdon Coburn; two by Will A. Cadby; one by W. B. Post.
Texts: Charles Caffin on Alvin Langdon Coburn; Sadakichi Hartmann on Carnegie exhibit; miscellaneous by Will A. Cadby, Dallett Fuguet, and others.

Number 7, July 1904 
Photographs: six by Theodor and Oscar Hofmeister; two by Robert Demachy; one by Edward Steichen; one by Mary Devens.
Texts: Ernst Juhl on the Hofmeisters; Robert Demachy on gum prints; miscellaneous by A. K. Boursault, F. H. Evans, and others; appeal to subscribers.

Number 8, October 1904 
Photographs: six by J. Craig Annan; one by Alvin Langdon Coburn; one by F. H. Evans; six silhouette portraits by John Barrett Kerfoot.
Texts: Joseph Keiley on J. Craig Annan; John Barrett Kerfoot on silhouettes and satire; Alfred Stieglitz on foreign exhibits; miscellaneous others.

Number 9, January 1905 
Photographs: five by Clarence White; one by Edward Steichen; four by Eva Watson-Schütze.
Texts: Joseph Keiley on Eva Watson-Schütze; John W. Beatty on Clarence White; F. H. Evans on the 1904 London photographic salon; John Barrett Kerfoot on satire; new series of reprints of New York critics, here on "First American Salon in New York"; miscellaneous others; quotations from Sebastian Melmoth.

Number 10, April 1905 
Photographs: seven by Gertrude Käsebier; two by C. Yarnall Abbott; one by E. M. Bane.
Other Art: one Outamaro print; paintings by Thomas W. Dewing and Sandro Botticelli, Primavera (b & w).
Texts: Roland Rood on plagiarism; Charles Fitzgerald (a generally antagonistic critic on the New York Sun, often reprinted later in Camera Work), "Edward Steichen: Painter and Photographer"; miscellaneous others.

Number 11, July 1905 
Photographs: six by David Octavius Hill; two by Edward Steichen; one by Robert Demachy; two by A. Horsley Hinton.
Texts: J. Craig Annan on David Octavius Hill; Dallett Fuguet on art and originality; John Barrett Kerfoot (satire); various technical pieces; Alfred Stieglitz announces Camera Work's plans for 1906.

Number 12, October 1905 
Photographs: ten by Alfred Stieglitz: Horses (1904), Winter, Fifth Avenue (misdated 1892, taken February 1893), Going to the Post (1904), Spring (1901), Nearing Land (1904), Katherine (1905), Miss S. R. (1904), Ploughing (1904), Gossip, Katwyck (1894), September (1899); three by E. Benedict Herzog.
Other Art: reprinted hieroglyphics and cave sketches (half page); two by Giotto; one by Sandro Botticelli (detail from Primavera); one by Diego Velázquez.
Texts: Charles Caffin on "Verities and Illusions"; Roland Rood on the evolution of art; announcement of the opening of the Little Galleries of the Photo-Secession Gallery around 1 November; miscellaneous others; quotations from Sebastian Melmoth.

Number 13, January 1906 
Photographs: three by Hugo Henneberg; four by Heinrich Kuhn; five by Hans Watzek.
Other Art: Edward Steichen poster of Photo-Secession.
Texts: F. Mathies-Masuren on Hugo Henneberg, Heinrich Kuhn, and Hans Watzek; Charles Caffin "Verities & Illusions II "; F. H, Evans on the 1905 London Salon (with a list of American photos shown); miscellaneous others.

Number 14, April 1906 
Photographs: nine by Edward Steichen; four by Alfred Stieglitz of exhibitions at 291, Edward Steichen in March, Clarence White and Gertrude Kasebier in February, and opening exhibition November—January (two images). One Edward Steichen cover design (woman with globe).
Texts: George Bernard Shaw, "The Unmechanicalness of Photography" and review of a London exhibition; John Barrett Kerfoot (satire); reprints of critics on Photo-Secession Gallery shows; calendar of shows.

Special Steichen supplement, April 1906 
Photographs: sixteen by Edward Steichen, including portraits of Eleanora Duse, Maurice Maeterlinck, J. R Morgan, and August Rodin, and several half-tones (hand-colored).
Texts: Maurice Maeterlinck, "I Believe."

Number 15, July 1906 
Photographs: five by Alvin Langdon Coburn; one by George Bernard Shaw, portrait of Alvin Langdon Coburn; one by Edward Steichen, experiment in three-color photography, unretouched half-tone plate printed directly by engraver from three diapositives; one by George Henry Seeley.
Texts: articles by Charles Caffin and Roland Rood; George Bernard Shaw on Alvin Langdon Coburn; John Barrett Kerfoot, "The ABC of Photography, A–G"; miscellaneous others, including report on First Pennsylvania Academy photo shows arranged by Joseph Keiley, Edward Steichen, and Alfred Stieglitz; sales of around $2,800 for prints averaging $45+ from gallery shows during 1905–6.

Number 16, October 1906 
Photographs: seven by Robert Demachy; three by C. (Emile Joachim Constant) Puyo; two by René LeBégue.
Texts: Robert Demachy on Rawlins oil process; Charles Caffin on recent shows; John Barrett Kerfoot, "The ABC of Photography, H—N"; miscellaneous others.

Number 17, January 1907 
Photographs: six by Joseph Keiley; two by F. Benedict Herzog; one by Harry Cogswell Rubincam; one by A. Radclyffe Dugmore.
Other Arts: two by James Montgomery Flagg, two-color satiric watercolor "portraits.’
Texts: Charles Caffin on F. Benedict Herzog: John Barrett Kerfoot, "The ABC of Photography, O—T’ ", F. H. Evans on the London Salon 1906; miscellaneous others.

Number 18, April 1907 
Photographs: Six by George Davison; two by Sarah C. Sears; two by William B. Dyer.
Texts: Charles Caffin, "Symbolism and Allegory "; R. Child Bayley on Pictorial photography; John Barrett Kerfoot, "The ABC of Photography, U—Z"; Robert Demachy on "modified" prints, answered by George Bernard Shaw; F. H. Evans; Frank Meadow Sutcliffe; miscellaneous others.

Number 19, July 1907 
Photographs: five by J. Craig Annan; one by Edward Steichen.
Texts: Robert Demachy on the "Straight Print"; miscellaneous by Dallett Fuguet, Charles Caffin, John Barrett Kerfoot, and others.

Number 20, October 1907 
Photographs: Six by George Henry Seeley ; three Alfred Stieglitz "snapshots", From My Widow, New York (post 1898), From My Window, Berlin (1888–90), In the New Work Central Yards (1903); one by W. Renwick.
Texts: Alfred Stieglitz, "The New Color Photography" (first report on Lumière autochromes; his first experiments with the process were in June 1907); Joseph Keiley on Gertrude Käsebier; C. A. Brasseur on color photography; miscellaneous others.

Number 21, January 1908 
Photographs: twelve by Alvin Langdon Coburn.
Texts: (unsigned) "Is Photography a New Art?"; Charles Caffin and others. Delay of a color issue explained.

Number 22, April 1908 (color number) 
Photographs: three by Edward Steichen, BS, On the Houseboat, Lady H. (reproduced in four color half-tones by A. Bruckmann & Co., Munich).
Texts: Edward Steichen, "Color Photography "; Charles Caffin and J. C. Strauss on the expulsion of Alfred Stieglitz from the New York Camera Club; list of over forty members of the Camera Workers, a new group of photographers who had resigned from the Camera Club, with headquarters at 122 East z5th Street; miscellaneous others, including reviews of Auguste Rodin drawings at 291 in January.

Number 23, July 1908 
Photographs: sixteen by Clarence White.
Texts: Charles Caffin on a Clarence White and George Henry Seeley exhibition; reprints of critics on Henri Matisse exhibition; Alfred Stieglitz, "Frilling and Autochromes"; miscellaneous others.

Number 24, October 1908 
Photographs: seven by Adolph de Meyer; one by William F. Wilmerding; two by Guido Rey.
Texts: George Besson interviews artists including Auguste Rodin and Henri Matisse about Pictorial photography; Charles Caffin, "The Camera Point of View in Painting and Photography"; miscellaneous others.

Number 25, January 1909 
Photographs: five by Annie W. Brigman; one by Emma Spencer; one by C. Yarnall Abbott; two by Frank Eugene, including a portrait of Alfred Stieglitz.
Texts: Charles Caffin, "Henri Matisse and Isadora Duncan"; John Barrett Kerfoot on Henri Matisse; J. Nilsen Laurvik on Annie W. Brigman; miscellaneous others: Photo-Secession members’ list.

Number 26, April 1909 
Photographs: six by Alice Boughton; one by J. Craig Annan; one by George Davison.
Texts: Benjamin de Casseres, "Caricature and New York"; Sir (Caspar) Purdon Clarke on "Art" and Oscar Wilde on "The Artist"; J. Nilsen Laurvik on the show International Photography at the National Arts Club: miscellaneous others.

Number 27, July 1909 
Photographs: five by Herbert C;. French; four by Clarence White and Alfred Stieglitz (collaboration).
Texts: H. G. Wells, "On Beauty" Benjamin de Casseres on Pamela Colman Smith; Charles Caffin on Adolph de Meyer and Alvin Langdon Coburn shows; New York critics on Alfred Maurer and John Mario at 291; quotations from  Oscar Wilde; miscellaneous others.

Number 28, October 1909 
Photographs: six by David Octavius Hill; one by George Davison; one by Paul Burty Haviland; one by Marshall R. Kernochan; one by Alvin Langdon Coburn.
Texts: unsigned piece on Impressionism; Charles Caffin on Edward Steichen's pictures of Rodin's Balzac and on the Dresden international photo show; quotations from Friedrich Nietzsche, "To the Artist Who is Eager for Fame"; miscellaneous others,

Number 29, January 1910 
Photographs: ten by George Henry Seeley.
Caricatures: four by Marius de Zayas.
Texts: Sadakichi Hartmann; Julius Meier-Graefe on Henri de Toulouse-Lautrec lithographs: other critics on Photo-Secession Galleries exhibition; miscellaneous others.

Number 30, April 1910 
Photographs: ten by Frank Eugene.
Caricatures: one by Marius de Zayas, of Alfred Stieglitz.
Texts: William D. MacColl on art criticism; Sadakichi Hartmann on composition; Charles Caffin on Edward Steichen; New York critics on Edward Steichen, John Mann, and Henri Matisse; miscellaneous others, including announcement of Albright Gallery show in Rochester (November).

Number 31, July 1910 
Photographs: fourteen by Frank Eugene.
Texts: Max Weber, "The Fourth Dimension from a Plastic Point of View" and "Chinese Dolls and Modern Colonists"; Paul Burty Haviland in defense of including other arts at 291 gallery and in Camera Work; Sadakichi Hartmann on Marius de Zayas; New York critics on Younger American Painters show; miscellaneous others.

Number 32, October 1910 
Photographs: five by J. Craig Annan; one by Clarence White; advertisement by Alvin Langdon Coburn.
Drawings: two by Matisse (nudes); one by Cordon Craig (stage design).
Texts: Sadakichi Hartmann on Puritanism; J. Annan on photography as "artistic expression"; Benjamin de Casceres on "Decadence and Mediocrity"; Elie Nadelman, "My Drawings"; miscellaneous others.

Number 33, January 1911 
Photographs: fifteen by Heinrich Kuhn (some mezzotint, some duplex half-tone),
Texts: Charles Caffin, Joseph Keiley, Alvin Langdon Coburn, and others on Albright Gallery shows; Sadakichi Hartmann, "What Remains?"; Max Weber, poem to primitive Mexican art; miscellaneous others,

Numbers 34–35, April–July 1911
Photographs: four by Edward Steichen, including Auguste Rodin and Balzac.
Drawings: Auguste Rodin, two gravures, seven colored collotypes.
Texts: Benjamin de Casseres; Agnes Ernst Meyer; Sadakichi Hartmann on Auguste Rodin; George Bernard Shaw, "A Page from Shaw "; Marius de Zayas on the Paris Salon d’Automne; Charles Caffin on Paul Cézanne; Marius de Zayas on Pablo Picasso; L.F. Hurd, Jr.; miscellaneous others,

Number 36, October 1911 
Photographs: sixteen by Alfred Stieglitz: The City of Ambition (1910), The City Across the River (1910), The Ferry Boat (1910), The Mauretania (1910), Lower Manhattan (1910), Old and New New York (1910), The Aeroplane (1910), A Dirigible (1910), The Steerage (1907), Excavating, New York (1911), The Swimming Lesson (1906), The Pool – Deal (1910), The Hand of Man
(1902), In the New York Central Yards (1903), The Terminal (1892), Spring Showers, New York (1903). 
Drawings: one by Pablo Picasso.
Texts: Benjamin de Casseres, "The Unconscious in Art"; quotations from Henri Bergson and Plato; Alvin Langdon Coburn, "The Relation of Time to Art"; miscellaneous others.

Number 37, January 1912 
Photographs: now by David Octavius Hill (and Robert Adams).
Texts: Benjamin de Casseres on modernity and decadence; Sadakichi Hartmann on originality; Henri Bergson on the object of art: Archibald Henderson on George Bernard Shaw and photography; Maurice Maeterlinck on photography; Charles Caffin on Adolph de Meyer; Gelett Burgess, "Essays in Subjective Symbolism"; miscellaneous others,

Number 38, April 1912 
Photographs: five by Annie W, Brigman; eight by Karl F. Struss,
Texts: Benjamin de Casseres, "The Ironical in Art"; Sadakichi Hartmann, "The Esthetic Significance of the Motion Picture"; reprints of Ness York critics; miscellaneous others.

Number 39, July 1912 
Photographs: Six by Paul Burty Haviland; one by H . Mortimer Lamb.
Paintings: two John Marin watercolors (three-color half-tone).
Drawings: two by Manuel Manolo.
Caricatures: one by Marius de Zayas, of Alfred Stieglitz.
Texts: Marius de Zayas, "The Sun Has Set"; Sadakichi Hartmann on Henri Matisse; quotations from Wassily Kandinsky's "On the Spiritual in Art" (pre–English translation); J. Nilsen Laurvik on John Mann; Sadakichi Hartmann on children's drawings; Benjamin de Casseres, "The Mocker"; miscellaneous others.

Special Number, August 1912 
Paintings: five by Henri Matisse; three by Pablo Picasso.
Drawings: two by Pablo Picasso.
Sculptures: two by Henri Matisse; two by Pablo Picasso (all half-tone photo reproduction).
Texts: Editorial on contents; Gertrude Stein, "Henri Matisse" and "Pablo Picasso" (first publication of her work in the United States).

Number 40, October 1912 
Photographs: fourteen by Adolph de Meyer.
Texts: John Galsworthy, "Vague Thoughts on Art"; Hutchins Hapgood, "A New Form of literature"; quotations from the letters of Vincent van Gogh; miscellaneous others.

Number 41, January 1913 
Photographs: five by Julia Margaret Cameron; four by Alfred Stieglitz, two  entitled A Snapshot, Paris (1911), The Asphalt Paver, New York (1892), Portrait S. R. (1904).
Texts: Marius de Zayas, "Photography" and "The Evolution of Form Introduction" reprints from New York critics; miscellaneous others.

Special Number, June 1913 
Paintings: three by Paul Cézanne; one by Vincent van Gogh; two by Pablo Picasso; one by Francis Picabia.
Drawings: one by Pablo Picasso (half-tone photo reproduction).
Texts: Gertrude Stein, "Portrait of Mabel Dodge at the Villa Curonia"; Mabel Dodge, "Speculations"; Gabrielle Buffet, "Modern Art and the Public"; Francis Picabia, "Vers L’Amorphisme"; Benjamin de Casseres, ‘The Renaissance of the Irrational"; miscellaneous others; "Are You Interested in the Deeper Meaning of Photography?"

Numbers 42–43, April—July 1913 (published November) 
Photographs: fourteen by Edward Steichen (including duogravures).
Paintings: three by Edward Steichen (reproduced in three-color half-tones).
Texts: Marius de Zayas, "Photography and Artistic Photography"; Mary Steichen, poem; New York critics on 291; John Mann, "Statement on his Show"; Francis Picabia, "Preface to His Show"; Marius de Zayas, "Preface to His Show"; John Weichsel, "Cosmism or Amorphism?’

Number 44, October 1913 (published March 1914) 
Photographs: one by Edward Steichen; one by Alfred Stieglitz, Two Towers, New York; one by Annie W. Brigman.

Number 45, January 1914 (published June)
Photographs: eight by J. Craig Annan.
Texts: Mina Loy, "Aphorisms on Futurism" ; Marsden Hartley, foreword for exhibition; Mabel Dodge on Marsden Hartley; Gertrude Stein, "From a Play by Gertrude Stein on Marsden Hartley"; reprints of New York critics; notice of photo shows planned for 291; miscellaneous others.

Number 46, April 1914 (published October) 
Photographs: two by Paul Burty Haviland; one by Frederick H. Pratt.
Caricatures: ten by Marius de Zayas.
Texts: John Weichsel, "Artists and Others"; poems by Katharine Rhoades and Mina Loy; Marius de Zayas on caricature; Paul Burty Haviland on Marius de Zayas; poem by "S.S.S." (Alfred Stieglitz's sister Selma); shows planned.

Number 47, July 1914 (published January 1915) 
No illustrations. 
Texts: Alfred Stieglitz, "What is 291 ?" Replies: Mabel Dodge, Hutchins Hapgood, Charles E. S. Rasay, Adolf Wolff, Hodge Kirnan, Annie W. Brigman, Clara Steichen, Ward Muir, Abby Hedge Coryell, Frank Pease, Stephen Hawes, Rex Stovel, Alfred Kreymborg, Francis Bruguiére, Ethel Montgomery Andrews, Frances Simpson Stevens, Djuna Barnes, Paul Burty Haviland, Charles Demuth, Konrad Cramer, Charles Daniel, Anna C. Pellew, Helen R. Gibbs, H. Mortimer Lamb, Marsden Hartley, Arthur B. Davies, Arthur C. Dove, John W. Breyfogle, William Zorach, Velida, Max Merz, Eugene Meyer,. Jr., Arthur B. Caries, Emil Zoler, J. Nilsen Laurvik, S.S.S., Christian Brinton, N. E. Montross, Hugh H. Breckenridge, Helen W. Henderson, Ernest Haskell, Frank Fleming, Lee Simonson, Arthur Hoeber, William F. Gable, A. Walkowitz, F. W. Hunter, Oscar Bluemner, C. Duncan, Katharine Rhoades, Agnes Ernst Meyer, Marion H. Beckett, Clifford Williams, Samuel Halpert, Man Ray, Marie J. Rapp, Charles Caffin, Dallett Fuguet, Belle Greene, Edward Steichen, Hippolyte Havel, Henry McBridge, Torres Palomar, John Weichsel, John Barrett Kerfoot, Francis Picabia, Marius de Zayas, John Marin.

Number 48, October 1916 
Photographs: one by Frank Eugene; six by Paul Strand; one by Arthur Allen Lewis; one by Francis Bruguiére; six by Alfred Stieglitz, exhibitions at 291: Negro Art (November 1914), German and Viennese Photographers (March 1906), Detail, Picasso, Braque (January 1915), Nadelmanau, room 1 (December 1915), Nadelman, room 2 (December 1915).
Texts: 291 exhibitions 1914–16; Marius de Zayas, "Modern Art in Connection with Negro Art"; A. E. Meyer on Marion H. Becker and Katharine Rhoades; Elie Nadelman on his shows; Abraham Walkowitz on his shows; Marsden Hartley on his shows; C. Duncan and Evelyn Sayer on "Georgia O'Keeffe, C. Duncan and René Lafferty-"; New York critics reprints; announcing "291 , a new publication"; reprint from 291, July—August 1915 of Marius de Zayas piece; unsigned, "291 and the Modern Gallery "; Marsden Hartley, "Epitaph for A. S."

Numbers 49–50, June 1917 (final issue) 
Photographs: eleven by Paul Strand, including The White Fence, Abstraction Porch Shadows, and Abstraction Bowls.
Texts: Paul Strand, "Photography"; W. Murrell Fisher on O’Keeffe drawings and paintings; Charles Caffin on 1916–17 Season shows at 291; Stanton MacDonald Wright, foreword to his show; extract from letter from Frank Eugene; miscellaneous others.

Notes

External links

Find here every photogravure from Camera Work
Camera Work at The Modernist Journals Project: a cover-to-cover, searchable digital edition of all 50 issues, from January 1903 (No. 1) through June 1917 (No. 49-50). PDFs of all 50 issues may be downloaded for free from the MJP website.
Camera Work: A Photographic Quarterly online at Heidelberg University Library
Facsimile set of Camera Work, republished

The complete set of facsimile publications of Camera Work https://cameraworkmagazine.com/

Photography magazines
Photography in the United States
Quarterly magazines published in the United States
Defunct magazines published in the United States
Magazines established in 1903
Magazines disestablished in 1917
1903 establishments in the United States
1917 disestablishments in the United States
Camera Work